Megalotus is a monotypic genus of flowering plants from the orchid family, Orchidaceae. The single species in the genus is Megalotus bifidus (formerly Saccolabium bifidum). It is endemic to the Philippines.

See also 
 List of Orchidaceae genera

References 

 Pridgeon, A.M., Cribb, P.J., Chase, M.A. & Rasmussen, F. eds. (1999). Genera Orchidacearum 1. Oxford Univ. Press.
 Pridgeon, A.M., Cribb, P.J., Chase, M.A. & Rasmussen, F. eds. (2001). Genera Orchidacearum 2. Oxford Univ. Press.
 Pridgeon, A.M., Cribb, P.J., Chase, M.A. & Rasmussen, F. eds. (2003). Genera Orchidacearum 3. Oxford Univ. Press
 Berg Pana, H. 2005. Handbuch der Orchideen-Namen. Dictionary of Orchid Names. Dizionario dei nomi delle orchidee. Ulmer, Stuttgart

External links

The Orchids of the Philippines

Aeridinae
Monotypic Epidendroideae genera
Vandeae genera
Orchids of the Philippines